Free to Worship is an album from contemporary gospel singer Fred Hammond. The album was recorded on April 14, 2006, and released on October 31, 2006 through Verity Records.

Track listing

 "My Heart Is for You" (Fred Hammond, Rodrick Long) - 5:04
 "He'll Do It!" (Hammond, Jason Jordan) - 5:33
 "Lord Your Grace" (Derek "DC" Clark, Hammond) - 5:32
 "This Is the Day" (Everett Jr. Williams) - 4:49
 "More of You" (PamKenyon M. Donald, Hammond, Jerome Harmon, Ericka Warren, Caltomeesh "Candy" West) - 5:05
 "Every Time I Think" (Patrick Dopson, Hammond, Bobby Sparks) - 5:11
 "Keep on Praisin'" (Donald, Hammond, Sparks, Warren, West) - 5:57
 "No Greater Love" (Noel Hall, Hammond, Kim Rutherford) - 6:11
 "L.O.U.D. L.O.U.D." (Hammond) - 6:00
 "There Is No Place" (Warren Campbell, Hammond) - 3:19
 "Thank You (I Won't Complain)" (Donald, Hammond, Shelton Summons, Warren) - 6:15
 "Simply Put" (Hammond, Hallerin Hilton Hill) - 6:38
 "And We Worship You" (Hammond, Long) - 5:11

Credits
Producer:
 Fred Hammond

Executive Producers:
 Fred Hammond
 Max Siegel

Arrangers:
 Calvin Rodgers - Arranger
 Fred Hammond - Arranger, Horn Arrangements, Vocal Arrangements

Worship Leader:
 Fred Hammond

Musicians:
 Jason "JT" Thomas-Drums
 Calvin Rodgers – Drums, Music Director
 Shelton Summons – Fender Rhodes
 Steve Goldsmith - Keyboards
 Kermit Wells - Keyboards
 Darius Fentress - Percussion, Drum Programming
 Darryl Dixon - Guitar
 Steve Lewis III - Flute, Keyboards, Strings
 Jerome Harmon - Keyboards 
 Shaun Martin - Fender Rhodes 
 Maxx Frank - Organ
 Warryn Campbell - Piano
 Todd Parsnow – Guitar
 Jason Jordan – Keyboards
 Tim Pitchford – Trombone
 Matt Cappy – Trumpet
 Charles Laster, Jr. - Keyboards
 Fred Hammond – Bass, Flute, Strings, Drum Programming, Keyboards
 Bobby Sparks - Organ, Keyboards, Moog Synthesizer
 Rodrick Long - Organ, Keyboards,

Vocals: 
 Davey Hammond
 Tillunda Lawson
 Michael Bethany
 Lisa Robinson
 Frank Lawson 
 Nakisha Bethany
 Dynna Wilson Wells
 Adrian Smith
 Kari Wilson
 Ericka Warren
 Pamkenyon Donald
 Candy West
 Candace Laster Jones
 Charles Laster, Jr.

Engineers
 Chris Athens - Mastering
 Darius Fentress - Assistant Engineer
 Steve Lewis III - Engineer
 Fred Hammond - Engineer, Mixing,
 Ray Hammond - Engineer, Mixing, Mixing Engineer, Sound Reinforcement, Sound Technician
 John Jaszcz - Engineer
 Timothy Powell - Engineer
 Chris Godbey - Engineer
 Kevin Wilson - Audio Engineer

Awards

At the 38th GMA Dove Awards, Free to Worship was nominated for a Dove Award for Contemporary Gospel Album of the Year.

Chart performance

The album peaked at #1 on Billboard's Christian and Gospel Albums charts. It spent 46 weeks on the latter

References

External links
Free to Worship in Amazon.com

2006 albums
Fred Hammond albums